Aeromachus inachus  is a butterfly in the family Hesperiidae (Hesperiinae) . It is found in the East Palearctic in Ussuri, Amur, Taiwan, Japan. The larva on feeds on Spodiopogon sibiricus and other 
Gramineae. There are two or more broods. The larva of this species hibernates.

Subspecies
Aeromachus inachus inachus
Aeromachus inachus formosanus Matsumura, 1931
Aeromachus inachus jiujianganus Murayama

References

i
Butterflies described in 1859